was a , also known as Chi'an,  after Kannin and before Manju. This period spanned the years from February 1021 through July 1024.

Change of Era
 1021 :  The era name was changed to mark an event or series of events. The previous era ended and a new one commenced in Kannin 5, on the 2nd day of the 2nd month of 1021.

Events of the Jian era
 1023 (Jian 3, 4th month): An epidemic in Kyoto was so severe that there were corpses in the streets; disease spread throughout the country.
 1023 (Jian 3, 10th month): Fujiwara no Michinaga visits Mt. Koya.
 December 29, 1023 (Jian 3, 14th day of the 11th month): a lunar eclipse.

Notes

References
 Brown, Delmer M. and Ichirō Ishida, eds. (1979).  Gukanshō: The Future and the Past. Berkeley: University of California Press. ;  OCLC 251325323
 Nussbaum, Louis-Frédéric and Käthe Roth. (2005).  Japan encyclopedia. Cambridge: Harvard University Press. ;  OCLC 58053128
 Titsingh, Isaac. (1834). Nihon Odai Ichiran; ou,  Annales des empereurs du Japon.  Paris: Royal Asiatic Society, Oriental Translation Fund of Great Britain and Ireland. OCLC 5850691
 Varley, H. Paul. (1980). A Chronicle of Gods and Sovereigns: Jinnō Shōtōki of Kitabatake Chikafusa. New York: Columbia University Press. ;  OCLC 6042764

External links
 National Diet Library, "The Japanese Calendar" -- historical overview plus illustrative images from library's collection

Japanese eras